A superspy is a glamorous, important spy, especially seen in spy fiction.

Super Spy may also refer to:

 Super Spy (video game), 1996 video game
 Super Spy (film), 2004 comedy film
 The Super Spy, 1990 video game